Alice Ames Winter (November 25, 1865 – April 5, 1944) was an American litterateur, author and clubwoman. She served as president of the General Federation of Women's Clubs (GFWC).

Early years and education

Alice Vivian Ames was born in Albany, New York, November 25, 1865. Her parents were Rev. Charles Gordon and Fanny Baker Ames, philanthropist and women's rights activist. She had three siblings, including a sister, Edith Theodora Ames; 
a brother, Theodore, who died in infancy; and a half brother, Charles Wilberforce Ames. Her ancestors included Francis and John Cooke, and Richard Warren who arrived in the United States in 1620 on the Mayflower.

Winter was a student at the Pennsylvania Academy Fine Arts. She graduated from Wellesley College in 1886 with a B.A. degree, and in 1889 with an M.A. degree.

Career
During the period of 1890 to 1892, Winter worked as a teacher, and in the 1890s, she served as president of the Minneapolis Kindergarten Association. She was one of the founders and was the first president (1907-15) of the Minneapolis Woman's Club. 

During World War I, she was chairman of the Council of National Defense Minnesota Woman's Committee and the Minnesota Commission of Public Safety Women's Auxiliary. She also served as director of the Minnesota Child Labor Commission, and of the Minneapolis chapter of the American Red Cross. Winters used the connections that she made on these committees to further the cause of woman suffrage. 

After the war, she continued her organizational activities as vice-president (1918-20) and president (1920-24) of the GFWC. In 1920, she was affiliated with the establishment of the Women's Joint Congressional Committee. In 1928, she served as director of the Home Women's Bureau and the Republican National Committee. Winter was a member of Clio, the Minnesota Playground Association, League of American Pen Women, New Century, Shakespeare Club, and the Woman's Friday Morning Club. 

Her works included Prize to the Hardy, Bobbs-Merrill, 1905; Jewell Weed, 1907; and Charles Ames, a Biography, Houghton. Mifflin, 1913.

Personal life
On June 25, 1892, she married Thomas Gerald Winter, of Minneapolis, Minnesota. They had a son, Charles Gilbert, and a daughter, Edith Winter Ames. In religion, Winter was a Unitarian.  

She died April 5, 1944. Her papers are held at the Hoover Institution.

Selected works
 How shall we judge a motion picture?, 19??
 The Prize to the Hardy ... With drawings by R.M. Crosby. [A novel.]., 1905
 Jewel Weed ... With illustrations by Harrison Fisher., 1906
 Women's Clubs To-day, 1921
 To American women : a plea, 1922
 The business of being a club woman, 1925
 The little woman who made a great war, 1927
 The Heritage of Women., 1928
 What do we want of a president?., 1928
 Hopeful tides in American politics, 1928
 A woman's reason in politics, 1928
 Better pictures in your home town : suggestions to local better films committees, 1932
 Motion picture study program : in four numbers, 1936

References

Citations

Attribution

Bibliography

External links 

 

1865 births
1944 deaths
Clubwomen
American suffragists
People from Albany, New York
20th-century American novelists
20th-century American non-fiction writers
20th-century American women writers
Wellesley College alumni
Republican National Committee members
American Red Cross personnel